Pearisburg is a town in Giles County, Virginia. The population was 2,786 at the time of the 2010 census. It is the county seat of Giles County. Pearisburg is part of the Blacksburg–Christiansburg Metropolitan Statistical Area.

History
Pearisburg was founded in 1808 when Giles County was established. It was named after George Pearis, a local landowner who donated a  tract to be used for a town that would grow up around the county court house. Pearis had operated a ferry on the New River at a settlement called "Bluff City", which is incorporated into the present boundaries of the town of Pearisburg.

Geography
Pearisburg is located slightly west of the center of Giles County at  (37.329184, −80.732490). The Appalachian Trail descends Pearis Mountain and passes through the western limit of the town before crossing the New River.

U.S. Route 460 passes through the north side of town, leading southeast  to Blacksburg and west  to Princeton, West Virginia. Virginia Route 100 passes through the center of Pearisburg, leading south  to Dublin near Interstate 81.

Demographics

As of the census of 2000, there were 2,729 people, 1,219 households, and 789 families residing in the town. The population density was 890.7 people per square mile (344.3/km2). There were 1,279 housing units at an average density of 417.5 per square mile (161.4/km2). The racial makeup of the town was 96.12% White, 2.02% African American, 0.07% Native American, 0.51% Asian, 0.44% from other races, and 0.84% from two or more races. Hispanic or Latino of any race were 0.70% of the population.

There were 1,219 households, out of which 27.3% had children under the age of 18 living with them, 49.0% were married couples living together, 11.5% had a female householder with no husband present, and 35.2% were non-families. 31.9% of all households were made up of individuals, and 17.1% had someone living alone who was 65 years of age or older. The average household size was 2.23 and the average family size was 2.77.

In the town, the population was spread out, with 22.1% under the age of 18, 6.8% from 18 to 24, 26.7% from 25 to 44, 24.7% from 45 to 64, and 19.8% who were 65 years of age or older. The median age was 41 years. For every 100 females, there were 88.6 males. For every 100 females age 18 and over, there were 81.6 males.

The median income for a household in the town was $33,720, and the median income for a family was $39,938. Males had a median income of $30,347 versus $23,482 for females. The per capita income for the town was $17,412. About 11.5% of families and 15.0% of the population were below the poverty line, including 19.1% of those under age 18 and 13.0% of those age 65 or over.

Climate
The climate in this area has mild differences between highs and lows, and there is adequate rainfall year-round. According to the Köppen Climate Classification system, Pearisburg has a marine west coast climate, abbreviated "Cfb" on climate maps.

Notable people 
Jason Ballard, member of the Virginia House of Delegates
Walter C. Caudill, former member of the Virginia House of Delegates and Senate of Virginia
James M. French, member of the Virginia Senate
Sally Miller Gearhart, author and political activist
David Emmons Johnston, congressman
Rick Kingrea, former NFL linebacker
Burgess Macneal, engineer and inventor
William McComas, congressman
Marty Smith, sports journalist
Randall Lee Smith, convicted murderer
Jefferson Stafford, member of the Virginia House of Delegates
James F. Strother, congressman
Creed Taylor, jazz record producer
John W. Williams, clerk of the Virginia House of Delegates
Joseph R. Yost, former member of the Virginia House of Delegates

References

External links

Town of Pearisburg official website

Towns in Virginia
Towns in Giles County, Virginia
County seats in Virginia
Blacksburg–Christiansburg metropolitan area
Populated places established in 1808
1808 establishments in Virginia